Shakedown is a 1936 American crime drama film, directed by David Selman from a screenplay by Grace Neville based on a story by Barry Shipman. The film stars Lew Ayres, Joan Perry, and Thurston Hall, and was released on July 17, 1936. This was Perry's film debut.

Cast list
 Lew Ayres as Bob Sanderson
 Joan Perry as Edith Stuart
 Thurston Hall as G. Gregory Stuart
 Victor Kilian as Caretaker
 Henry Mollison as Ralph Gurney
 John Gallaudet as Hawsley
 George McKay as Spud
 Gene Morgan as Presto Mullins
 Wyrley Birch as Mr. Morrison
 William Gould as Lieutenant
 Wade Boteler as Captain of detectives
 Edward Le Saint as Attorney
 Olaf Hytten as Butler
 George Offerman Jr. as Pat O'Roark
 Arthur Loft as Editor
 Murdock MacQuarrie as Attendant
 George French as Husband in cafe
 Helen Dickson as Wife in cafe
 Jack Dougherty as Detective
 Lee Shumway as Detective
 Bruce Mitchell as Plainclothes man
 Lee Prather as Desk sergeant
 Dick Allen as Assistant detective
 Frank Bull as Police broadcaster
 Ralph McCullough as Dispatcher
 Maurice Brierre as Waiter
 Albert Pollet as Head waiter
 Bob Burns as Pawnbroker

References

External links
 
 
 

Columbia Pictures films
Films directed by David Selman
1936 crime drama films
1936 films
American crime drama films
American black-and-white films
1930s English-language films
1930s American films